The 8th Night is a 2021 South Korean mystery-thriller film directed by Kim Tae-hyoung for Gom Pictures starring Lee Sung-min, Park Hae-joon, Kim Yoo-jung, and Nam Da-reum.  The film depicts the struggle of a former exorcist attempting to stop the resurrection of two mysterious beings who tormented humans and were locked up in separate caskets for 2500 years. It was released on Netflix and made available for streaming in 190 countries on July 2, 2021.

Plot
"A man, who was once an exorcist, suffers until he faces a demon that is freed. The night exists between real and unreal, their struggle to stop the resurrection of the demon has begun!"

About two and half millennium ago (2,500 years), a monster crossed the bridge from hell to the human realm to create human suffering. Buddha ripped both the Red Eye and the Black Eye from the monster and locked them inside different Śarīra caskets. Before the Red Eye surrendered to Buddha, it ran away for seven days by hiding inside human bodies. On the 8th day, the Red Eye looked back. Knowing that it could not escape Buddha, it surrendered itself. The Eyes were buried in the cliffs of the Far East and the desert of the Far West.  Buddha instructed his disciples to make sure they would never meet.

In the present, Professor Kim Joon-Cheol (Choi Jin-ho) sets out in the desert to prove the existence of the Śarīra caskets. He finds a relic which is presumed to be one of the caskets. However, the scientific community declares his findings to be fraudulent, and he is shunned by all. Fourteen years later, Professor Kim, now a bitter individual, is determined to prove the truth of his discovery by reuniting the Black Eye and Red Eye. He opens the casket and pours a vial of blood into it along with his own. Before Professor Kim is about to give up, the Red Eye emerges from the casket, presumably possessing Professor Kim.

In Gwangju, Bhante Ha-jung (Lee Eol), protector of the Black Eye casket, realizes the Red Eye has reawakened. He tells a young monk, Cheongseok (Nam Da-reum), the legend of the monster with two eyes. Later that night, Bhante Ha-jung tells Cheongseok that the Red Eye has awakened and will soon reunite with the Black Eye. They must slay at least the seventh pillar, the Virgin Shaman, to prevent the Red Eye from reuniting with the Black Eye. Cheongseok must find Bhante Seon-hwa (Lee Sung-min) and inform him of the situation. The following morning, Cheongseok finds Bhante Ha-jung dead, who presumably died in his sleep. Cheongseok finds the Śarīra casket beside the dead monk.

Meanwhile, in Chilgok, the Red Eye takes over a hunter and goes into a motel where a couple was seen checking in. The woman tells her boyfriend about a meditation group where she was given a free health check-up and a blood test. The hunter presumably attacks the couple who checked into the secluded motel. Detectives Kim Ho-Tae and Dong-jin investigate the scene and find the hunter's body dried and decomposed after just a few hours. Cameras show that the woman was seen leaving the hotel. Later on, the very same woman is found in another location, her body found in a similar state as that of the hunter's. Due to the bizarre condition of the two victims, Dong-jin suggestes the help of a virgin shaman that he knows. However, being a skeptic, Kim refuses the idea.

Cheongseok leaves Gwanju in search for Bhante Seon-hwa. Unfortunately, he had lost his bag containing the casket and some money. He presumed that it was taken by a young girl (Kim Yoo-Jung) who disappeared into the crowd. Cheongseok finds Seon-hwa, who is now a construction worker using his real name, Park Jin-soo, and tells him (via writing, due to his vow of silence) of what happened in Gwanju. In his flashbacks, it is revealed by Ha-jung's spirit that Seon-hwa left the monastery as he didn't want to be Ha-jung's successor. Seon-hwa also neglected his duty of 'helping lost souls ascend''', so their countless souls are clinging to his back. The following morning, Seon-hwa prepares to leave and search for the seventh pillar with Cheongseok following him. Seon-hwa presumes that the seventh pillar is the Virgin Shaman with which the monks of Gwanju are acquainted. Seon-hwa treats Cheongseok well, even buying him a new pair of shoes. Cheongseok thanks Seon-hwa, accidentally breaking his vow of silence.

Meanwhile, the Red Eye had already planned to move on from the woman at the motel. A delivery man answers her call as both of them were members of a 'meditation group'. The Red Eye then passes onto the delivery man, and later, Detective Kim is called to see the body of a woman stuffed in a sewer. The woman is also found decomposed and drained like the first two victims. A motorcycle and delivery cargo is also found abandoned nearby. 

Before boarding the bus, Seon-hwa was visited again by Ha-jung's spirit. It is revealed that Cheongseok's mother accidentally ran over Seon-hwa and his wife and daughter. His wife and child died, compelling Seon-hwa to live a life as a monk in Gwanju. When Cheongseok's mother died, she wrote a letter to Seon-hwa asking him to adopt Cheongseok. Seon-hwa does so, but leaves him in Gwanju. He then left the monastery and his duties, never becoming an ordained monk. As they arrived, Seon-hwa tells Cheongseok to search for shaman services around the area, hoping to find the Virgin Shaman. Upon learning of the recent bizzare murder, Seon-hwa goes to the tunnel where the woman and delivery motorcycle was found. Detective Kim stops him, asking for Seonhwa's credentials and ran his ID for any criminal records. When Kim asks Seon-hwa to open his bag, which contained an axe, Seonhwa tried to run away. The two got into a scuffle, and Seonhwa was forced to leave his map.

Cheongseok finds the house of the Virgin Shaman, and a young woman lets her in. She was the same young woman who took his belongings, but Cheongseok grew fond of her. Cheongseok leaves, but as soon as he stepped outside, he sees a student staring at him. The student revealed the Red Eye, being the sixth pillar. Cheongseok runs away in fear, and meets with Seon-hwa to inform him of what happened. Seonhwa tells Cheongseok to go back home, and reveals that he has to kill the young woman who he believes to be the seventh pillar and the Virgin Shaman. They go on their separate ways, but Cheongseok went back to the Virgin Shaman and took the Virgin Shaman away. Meanwhile, Dong-jin informs Kim of Seon-hwa's past. They were also able to connect the victims together. They were all members of a meditation group that Prof. Kim had set up, and Dong-jin had actually went to see one of them who was still alive--a woman who was the same Virgin Shaman Cheongseok unknowingly went to. Dong-jin had a talisman with his own blood made, thanks to the Virgin Shaman he met earlier, and gives it to Kim. It turns out that Kim saved Dong-jin from committing suicide, and he was indebted to Kim. Kim had Dong-jin leave while he uses Seonhwa's map to see if he could track down Seonhwa. 

Seonhwa finds the house of the Virgin Shaman, but the lady inside points to a note. When Seon-hwa confronts the lady, she strapped her face with talismans and Seonhwa prepared to strike her down. Detective Kim arrives in time to stop him, and the two squared off once more. Before Kim handcuffed Seonhwa, the possessed student arrived and threw him away, with the talisman he got from Dong-jin protecting him from further harm. The student realizes that the young woman had already left, and Seonhwa follows her, inscribing a talisman on his axe using his own blood. However, the student runs into Dong-jin, tricking the young detective to protect her from Seon-hwa. She possesses Dong-jin, and dries and decomposes. Dong-jin doesn't kill Seon-hwa, but tells him to head back to Gwanju, where he will die. 

Meanwhile, Cheongseok took the young woman to Gwanju, and Seon-hwa and the possessed Dong-jin arriving later. Detective Kim went back to the Virgin Shaman's house, and it is revealed that the lady who nearly died was the actual Virgin Shaman, and that the young woman Cheongseok was with is actually a ghost that she found living with Professor Kim. The real Virgin Shaman reveals that her name was Ae-ran, who was an abused child that was saved by Professor Kim. Professor Kim had groomed her to be the sacrifice that will assist the monster from reuniting its two Eyes. Professor Kim also tricked the members of the meditation group into donating their blood, via the 'free blood tests', in order to use their blood to summon the Red Eye, and later becoming the seven stepping stones. Ae-ran latched onto the Virgin Shaman, and she used her to trick Dong-jin into giving his own blood, so he could be possessed later on. It was also this Virgin Shaman, possessed by Ae-ran, who took the casket Cheongseok was carrying days ago. Detective Kim leaves to Gwanju in search for Dong-jin.

Seon-hwa finds Cheongseok in an abandoned shack, and the young monk realizes that he was all alone from the start, with the casket being in his possession. Seon-hwa instructs Cheongseok of their plan to trap Dong-jin, let the Red Eye possess him instead, and Cheongseok delivering the killing blow. The plan goes well, and they managed to trap Dong-jin inside. However, Dong-jin revealed that Ae-ran, nor the Virgin Shaman, weren't the seventh pillar he needed. Ae-ran's purpose was to bewitch the seventh pillar, Cheongseok. Because Seon-hwa left the monastery and didn't become Ha-jung's successor, the title was transferred to Cheongseok. This meant that only Cheongseok has the ability to open the casket containing the Black Eye. Dong-jin orders the ghost of Ae-ran to find Cheongseok, who was hiding nearby. Still bewitched, Ae-ran was able to remove Cheongseok's robe, which had a talisman Seon-hwa made. Dong-jin orders Seon-hwa to shoot himself for being such a failure in life, but Seon-hwa shoots Dong-jin instead, though futile.

Cheongseok runs away from the possessed Dong-jin, and encounters Detective Kim. Detective Kim tries to stop Dong-jin but was again thrown violently to the side, once again protected by Dong-jin's talisman in his pocket. Seon-hwa manages to shoot Dong-jin's weak left leg. but Dong-jin crawls to Cheongseok in pursuit. Seon-hwa delivers a killing blow to Dong-jin's back, but he got shot by Detective Kim. Detective Kim goes over to Dong-jin, but his corpse dried and decomposed. The Red Eye has successfully possessed Cheongseok, and it throws Detective Kim onto a sharp branch, killing the Detective. As the Black Eye materializes, the Red Eye grabs the dying Seon-hwa. It transforms itself to a young version of Cheongseok, and torments Seon-hwa into strangling the young boy, seeing as his mother was the cause of his family's deaths. However, Seon-hwa persists, caressing the young boy's cheek. The Red Eye reverts back to the grownup Cheongseok, and was about to kill Seon-hwa with the axe. Seon-hwa traps Cheongseok's arm while chanting a spell. As he was caressing Cheongseok's face, he was actually writing another talisman using his own blood onto Cheongseok's face. This forced the Red Eye to possess Seon-hwa, and he asks Cheongseok to kill him. Cheongseok gathers the courage to do so, killing Seon-hwa and stopping the reunion of the Red Eye and Black Eye in the process.

Cheongseok is later seen in the border of India and Pakistan, and returns the casket back to where it was first unearthed. Ae-run appears before him, and Cheongseok offers up his hand. As Ae-run's spirit grabs Cheongseok's hand, the chains on her ankles were unchained, presumably freeing her.

Cast
 Lee Sung-min as Park Jin-soo, the guardian
 Park Hae-joon as Kim Ho-tae, homicide detective
 Kim Yoo-jung as Ae-ran,  a girl with a secret
 Nam Da-reum as Cheong-seok
 Choi Jin-ho as Professor Kim Joon-cheol
 Lee Eol as Ha-jeong
 Kim Han-sol as delivery man
 Park Se-hyun as a high school girl

Production
Casting
In May 2019, Lee Seong-min, Park Hae-joon, Kim Yoo-jung, and Nam Da-reum were confirmed to appear in the film. Later, Lee Eul and Choi Jin-ho joined the cast.

Filming
Filming began on May 19, 2019 and was wrapped up on September 26, 2019. The film was shot in Suwon, Incheon, Paju, Daejeon, Daegu, Yeongyang-gun and Kazakhstan. It was set to release in 2020 but was postponed due to COVID-19.

Reception
 

Sarah Musnicky, writing in Nightmarish Conjurings, rated it with 4.5/5 stars and wrote that the screenplay is 'incredibly thoughtful' as it kept the audience guessing. She opined, "The writing helps to elevate the story beyond a typical “save the day” scenario." Musnicky also praised the performances of the cast because in her opinion that really helped the development of characters. Praising the FX makeup and the VFX, she penned, "And its in that simplicity that I think the Makeup and VFX teams really shone." Concluding the review Musnicky expressed, "Altogether, The 8th Night is a strong contender for one of my favorite films of 2021."

Johnny Loftus, writing for Decider, praised Nam Da-reum's performance. He opined that The 8th Night, was a well-made film which eschews 'big scares' and 'jump scenes' for a 'suitably creepy' juxtaposition of the supernatural and mundane. Ending his write-up, he wrote, "A different film might fling the door to Hell open with a little more flair, but The 8th Night still drives at its central conceit with subtle notes of character and spirit world mystery."

For JumpCut Online, Nguyen Le said the film has "the style, the startles and the sight to certify deeper currents" despite an overly rapid pacing and average English subtitling work that can cause details to be lost. He ended his 3.5/5 review by saying this is a film "you should, at least once, give the time of day to."

Writing for Culture Mix, Carla Hay opined that The 8th Night has innovative cinematography and visual effects making the film an above average horror film. Hay wrote that the film with solid plot overcame decoration over content scenes, and suspenseful and surprising twists made up for the film’s messy climax. Ending the review Hay said, "The 8th Night'' has enough captivating mystery and horror that viewers, confused or not, shouldn’t get easily bored from watching this movie."

References

External links
 
 
 
 
 
 

2021 films
2020s South Korean films
2020s Korean-language films
South Korean mystery films
Korean-language Netflix original films
Films not released in theaters due to the COVID-19 pandemic
South Korean thriller films
Films shot in Kazakhstan
2021 horror films